Baptiste Aloé (born 29 June 1994) is a French professional footballer who plays as a central defender for  club Nancy.

Club career

Marseille

Aloé was born in La Ciotat, Bouches-du-Rhône and as a young boy played for his local club, E.S. de La Ciotat, before joining Marseille in 2003. He made his professional debut on 4 October 2012 in the 2012–13 Europa League campaign against Cypriot side AEL Limassol in a 5–1 home win. He played the full 90 minutes as a right back. He made his first appearance in Ligue 1 as a second-half substitute in the visit to Lens on 2 November 2014, and played the whole of the 3–1 win at home to Bordeaux three weeks later.

On 6 March 2015, he made his first professional goal against Toulouse FC. During this period, he took part in fourteen matches.

Loans to Valenciennes
In late August 2015, Aloé was loaned out to Ligue 2 club Valenciennes.

At the end of October 2016, Aloé had to undergo meniscus surgery and was ruled out from football for at least a month.

Valenciennes
After two years of being on loan, Aloé signed on with a three-year contract.

Dinamo București
On 3 February 2022, he signed a contract with Romanian side Dinamo București.

Nancy
On 15 July 2022, Aloé joined Nancy on a two-year deal.

International career
Aloé played twice for France at under-18 level in 2012.

Aloé played once for France at under-21 level in 2015.

Career statistics

References

External links
 
 
 Eurosport profile
 

1994 births
Living people
People from La Ciotat
Sportspeople from Bouches-du-Rhône
Association football defenders
French footballers
France youth international footballers
France under-21 international footballers
Olympique de Marseille players
Valenciennes FC players
K Beerschot VA players
FC Dinamo București players
AS Nancy Lorraine players
Ligue 1 players
Ligue 2 players
Liga I players
French expatriate footballers
French expatriate sportspeople in Romania
Expatriate footballers in Romania
Footballers from Provence-Alpes-Côte d'Azur